Mimocrossotus ugandicola is a species of beetle in the family Cerambycidae. It was described by Stephan von Breuning in 1964. It is known from Uganda.

References

Endemic fauna of Uganda
Crossotini
Beetles described in 1964